Jason Stewart may refer to:

 Jason Stewart (American football) (born 1980), American football defensive tackle 
 Jason Stewart (athlete) (born 1981), New Zealand middle-distance runner
 Jason Stewart (film editor) (born 1975), American technician

See also
Jason Stuart (disambiguation)